The All-Ireland Senior Hurling Championship of 1975 was the 89th staging of Ireland's premier hurling knock-out competition.  Kilkenny won the championship, beating Galway 2-22 to 2-10 in the final at Croke Park, Dublin.

Rule change
As a result of a decision taken at the Gaelic Athletic Association's (GAA) annual congress the previous year, as of 1975 all provincial finals, All-Ireland semi-finals and the All-Ireland final itself were reduced to 70 minutes playing time.  Prior to this all championship matches were eighty minutes in duration for the past 5 years.

The championship

Format

Munster Championship

First round: (1 match) This is a single match between the first two teams drawn from the province of Munster.  One team is eliminated at this stage while the winners advance to the semi-finals.

Semi-finals: (2 matches) The winner of the first round joins the other three Munster teams to make up the semi-final pairings.  Two teams are eliminated at this stage while the winners advance to the final.

Final: (1 match) The winner of the two semi-finals contest this game.  One team is eliminated at this stage while the winners advance to the All-Ireland semi-final.

Leinster Championship

First round: (2 matches) These are two matches between the first four teams drawn from the province of Leinster.  Two teams are eliminated at this stage while the winners advance to the semi-finals.

Semi-finals: (2 matches) The winners of the two first round games join the other two Leinster teams to make up the semi-final pairings.  Two teams are eliminated at this stage while the winners advance to the final.

Final: (1 match) The winners of the two semi-finals contest this game.  One team is eliminated at this stage while the winners advance to the All-Ireland semi-final.

All-Ireland Championship

Quarter-final: (1 match) This is a single match between Galway and the winners of the All-Ireland 'B' championship.  One team is eliminated at this stage while the winners advance to the semi-final.

Semi-final: (1 match) This is a single match between the Munster champions and the winners of the quarter-final.  One team is eliminated at this stage while the winners advance to the final.

Final: (1 match) The winners of the semi-final and the Leinster champions contest this game.

Fixtures

Leinster Senior Hurling Championship

Munster Senior Hurling Championship

All-Ireland Senior Hurling Championship

Championship statistics

Miscellaneous

 All championship games were reduced from eighty to seventy minutes.
 The All-Ireland semi-final saw Galway defeat Cork for the very first time in the history of the championship.  It was also Cork's first-ever defeat in an All-Ireland semi-final.
 The All-Ireland final between Galway and Kilkenny was the first time that these two sides met at this stage of the championship.
 It was revealed after the All-Ireland final that Kilkenny's Liam 'Chunky' O'Brien had two teeth extracted on the day before the final and had to call a doctor to his home at 1 a.m. on the Sunday morning to stop a gum haemorrhage.

Top scorers

Season

Single game

Player facts

Debutantes

The following players made their début in the 1975 championship:

References

 Corry, Eoghan, The GAA Book of Lists (Hodder Headline Ireland, 2005).
 Donegan, Des, The Complete Handbook of Gaelic Games (DBA Publications Limited, 2005).

See also

1975